Cesare Benedetti (24 October 1920 in Treviso – 9 July 2002) was an Italian football player and a painter.

Football
He played for 3 seasons (37 games, 1 goal) in the Serie A for A.S. Roma and Salernitana Calcio 1919, winning the Serie A in the 1940/41 season with Roma.

Painting
After retirement as a footballer, he became a noted painter. He was accepted at the House of Grimaldi, painting portraits of Grace Kelly, Rainier III, Prince of Monaco, Caroline, Princess of Hanover and other dignitaries. He painted in the United States as well (including the portrait of Caroline Kennedy at 4 years of age). He also painted portraits of several Popes, including Pope John XXIII, Pope Pius XII, Pope Paul VI and a two-meters-high portrait of Pope John Paul II that hangs in the hall of the Treviso Cathedral, earning himself the nickname "Painter of Popes" ("pittore dei Papi").

 

1920 births
2002 deaths
Italian footballers
Serie A players
Treviso F.B.C. 1993 players
A.S. Roma players
U.S. Salernitana 1919 players
20th-century Italian painters
20th-century Italian male artists
Italian male painters
Association football defenders
Italian portrait painters
Sportspeople from Treviso
Footballers from Veneto